Argentino, also known as Balneario Argentino, is a village and seaside resort of the Costa de Oro in the Canelones Department of southern Uruguay.

Geography

Location

Population
In 2011 Argentino had a population of 68.

References

External links
 Instituto Nacional de Estadística: Plan of Argentino

Populated places in the Canelones Department
Seaside resorts in Uruguay